Nkinto is an administrative ward in the Mkalama District of the Singida Region of Tanzania. According to the 2002 census, the ward has a total population of 13,367. According to the 2012 census, the population had decreased to 10,372.

References

Wards of Singida Region